Kalateh-ye Mirabbas (also Romanized as Kalāteh-ye Mīrʿabbās) is a village in Joghatai Rural District, in the Central District of Joghatai County, Razavi Khorasan Province, Iran. At the 2006 census, its population was 16, in 4 families.

References 

Populated places in Joghatai County